Pietro Giuseppe Gaetano Boni (Bologna(?), second half XVII century – Bologna(?), around 1750) was an Italian composer.

Biography and Career
Born probably in Bologna, in the title page of his published works he is qualified as abate (Abbot) and had a musical formation  probably under the Accademia Filarmonica di Bologna, of which he was later member.
Since 1711 he was in Rome with Arcangelo Corelli and stayed there until 1720 at least. He published in Rome three books of sonatas, the first one for violoncello and cembalo (1717). In 1726 his oratorio Santa Rosalia was performed in Bologna. Boni left a manuscript of instrumental works.

Sometimes confused with Giovanni Boni.
To Boni has been attributed the opera Il figlio delle selve, performed in Modena in 1700, but he is possibly confused with Cosimo Bani

Works 
12 Sonate per camera a violoncello e cembalo, op. I, Roma, 1717

12 Divertimenti per camera a violino, violone, cimbalo, flauto e mandola, op. II, (1720), Antonio Cleton, Roma.

10 Sonate a violino e violone o cembalo,op. III,  Fasoli, Roma, 1741

Sonate per cembalo, manuscript.

cantata: Cantata per la notte di Natale, Perugia, 1719

opera: Tito Manlio, libretto by Matteo Noris, Roma, 1720

oratorio: Santa Rosalia, Bologna, 1726

Notes

References
 "Boni, Pietro Giuseppe Gaetano",  Dizionario Biografico degli Italiani, Treccani, vol. XII, 1971

External links 

Italian Baroque composers
Italian male classical composers
Musicians from Bologna
18th-century classical composers